New Caledonia, a part of the French Republic, uses French as its official language, following the constitutional law 92-554 (June 1992). The thirty New Caledonian languages form a branch of the Southern Oceanic languages. They are spoken mainly by the indigenous Kanaks of the islands.

Languages present at the time of colonisation
At the time of colonization, native speakers used their native language to communicate, and, in case of need, they used Bislama, an Anglo-Melanesian language whose lexical basis is essentially English. This language allowed them to communicate with shopkeepers or with the other Melanesian populations. Those native languages have been favoured by some of the missionaries to evangelize the population, the Catholic missionaries preferred the usage of French.

Thus, there were three languages used: French, English, and Bislama.

In 1853, a decree imposed the teaching of French in every school of the colony, and in 1863, only the teaching of French was allowed because the colonizers did not want the other languages to compete with French.

Present day
New Caledonia is constituted of numerous populations, but the vast majority is represented by Kanaks or Europeans. Nowadays, there are about 30 Melanesian languages present, and also other languages peculiar to the immigrant populations (Javanese, Vietnamese, Indonesian, Chinese, Filipino and others). Those populations have immigrated to New Caledonia during the nickel rush. The native languages of New Caledonia are part of the Austronesian family. This family extends from the island of Madagascar, Taiwan, Southeast Asia and covers almost all of the Pacific.

Native languages 

The forty native languages of New Caledonia form two branches of the Southern Oceanic languages, part of the Austronesian family; West Uvean is Polynesian. Their speakers are known as Kanaks. The most important are: Drehu, Nengone, Paicî, Ajië, and Xârâcùù. The other languages are spoken by a few hundred to couple thousand people and are endangered. Many Kanaks do not know their native languages very well because of the wide usage of French.

French 

New Caledonians of French and European descent generally speak French as their native language. Kanaks also speak a variety of French, New Caledonian French, which is characterized by some phonetic particularities and specific grammatical constructions derived from native languages. 

In the early colonial era, there had been a French pidgin used in New Caledonia as a contact language, especially along the east coast, alongside Bislama, and today there is a local French creole known as Tayo that may descend from it.

Foreign languages 
Because New Caledonia's main industry is tourism and most of the island's tourism is from Australia and New Zealand, English is also spoken in New Caledonia, however it is only widely spoken inside Nouméa and by those in the tourism industry.

The most commonly taught foreign languages are English and Japanese.

Legal status
New Caledonia being a part of French Republic, its official language is French, following the constitutional law  92-554 (June 1992). This law is applicable to every field (justice, tribunals, administration, schools...).
At the level of legislation and justice, on some occasions they may have recourse to a Melanesian language (in spoken conversation, for example).
A series of decrees and clauses allow the usage of Melanesian languages in education in some cases. The more important law to that purpose is the "Loi d’orientation d’Outre-Mer" (law 2000-1207, December 2000) which stipulates that we have to respect these native languages which are a part of New Caledonian culture.

Education
Secondary school is under State authority (as opposed to nursery and primary school, which are under Provincial authority), therefore, the language in application is French. Some schools give optional native languages lessons, but it is still very rare. Nevertheless, four languages are proposed at the baccalaureate: Ajië, Drehu, Nengone and Paicî.
There has been controversy about the educational system, as it has been claimed, that the programs are not adjusted to the population. As a French overseas department New Caledonia is almost exclusively under the administrative control of France at the educative level and the textbooks are tailored to European students. Moreover, French is only a second language for significant minority of New Caledonians. This situation has been described as a major cause for the high rate of illiteracy and academic failure by New Caledonian students. The success rate at the baccalaureate is very low.
Some have advocated to increase the importance of native languages as a teaching medium in school, while reducing the status French to that of a second language. Critics have pointed out, that proposal denies reality as French is the predominant native language among New Caledonian students.

References